The Protestant Church of Maluku is a Reformed church in Indonesia. It is known locally as: Gereja Protestan Maluku or simply GPM.  It was formed on September 6, 1935 when it was separated from the Protestant Church in Indonesia.
The Protestant Church of Maluku has congregations only in the provinces of Maluku and North Maluku.

History
1605 February 27: GPM began with their first service as the Gereja Protestan Calvanis (Calvinist Protestant Church) with Dutch citizens, employees of the Dutch East India Company (VOC), in Ambon.
1621 Forming of the church board, known as the Majelis Jemaat Indische Kerk, which was initially located in Batavia (Jakarta).
1622 The church board (Majelis Jemaat Indische Kerk) also had a body of leaders in Banda, which resulted in evangelism activities in Maluku, with increasing prevalence and intensity, particularly through the struggle of Adriaan Hulsebos, who attempted to go serve in Ambon, but his ship sang in the Bay of Ambon, he died, and his mission was continued by Pastor Rosskot (who was instrumental in organizing the first theological training in Ambon, Maluku, which was also the first in Indonesia).
1799 After the bankruptcy and dissolution of the VOC, many of the churches in Indonesia were dissolved, including some of the churches in Ambon.
1815–1833 Joseph Kam served in Ambon and throughout Maluku through the NZG (Nederlandsch Zendeling Genootschap).
1865 NZG stopped their official work in Maluku, but the church that had been planted continued to grow.
1930 The church continued to grow under the controle of the Dutch East Indies Company and was served by the Protestant Church of Indonesia (Gereja Protestan di Indonesia - GPI) and Nederlandse Zendeling Genotschaap (NZG).  Thea area of service covered almost the whole of the Maluku islands.
1935 September 6: The Protestant Church of Maluku (GPM) officially began its era of independence in areas of finance, liturgy, and church doctrine.
1950 RMS (South Maluku Independence Movement) burned much of the city of Ambon and large areas Seram island including many church buildings in their fight for bringing independence to South Maluku. 
1950 May 25: GPM became a member of PGI (Persekutuan Gererja-gereja di Indonesia - The Communion of Churches in Indonesia).
1993–2003 Conflict between Christians and Muslims throughout Maluku, resulting in thousands killed and hundreds of churches and mosques destroyed.

Church leadership

Current Church leaders
GPM Synod Daily Worker Assembly for the 2020-2025 Period :
(Majelis Pekerja Harian Sinode GPM Periode 2020-2025)

Leader: Pdt. Drs. Elifas Tomix Maspaitella.

Co-Leader 1: Pdt. Ny. L. Bakarbessy-Rangkoratat S.Th

Co-Leader 2: Pdt. H. I. Hetharie
General Secretary: Pdt. S.I. Sapulette

Deputy General Secretary: Pdt. R. Rahabeat

Member of MPH:

• Pdt. Y. Colling

• Pdt. N. Souisa-G

• Pnt. Ny. D. Sahertian

• Pnt. F. Papilaya

Note :
 Pnt. : Penatua/Elder
 Pdt. : Pendeta/Pastor

Previous Church leaders
1935–1938 
Ketua    : Pdt. J.E. Staap
Wakil Ketua : Pdt. W.H. Tutuarima
Sek.     : Pdt. P. Souhuwat
Bend.    : Pdt. Jack van Vesson

1938–1940 
Ketua      : Pdt. C. Hamel
Wakil Ketua : Pdt. W.H. Tutuarima
Sek.         : Pdt. P. Souhuwat
Bend.      : Pdt. H.J. Visser

1940–1942 
Ketua      : Pdt. W. van Oust
Wakil Ketua : Pdt. P. Poot
Sek.         : Pdt. P. Souhuwat
Bend.       : Pdt. H.J. Visser

1942–1943 (Zaman Pendudukan Jepang) 
Ketua      : Pdt. F. Siwabessy (Pj)
Sek.         : Pdt. P. Souhuwat Zaman Pendudukan Jepang

1943–1946 
Ketua      : Pdt. S. Marantika
Wakil Ketua : Pdt. J. Sapulete
Sek.         : Pdt. P. Souhuwat
Bend.       : Pdt. W.D.F. Amanupunyo

1946 (Transisi di Zaman Kemerdekaan RI) 
Ketua      : Pdt. J. Kalk
Wakil Ketua : Pdt. S. Marantika
Sek.         : Pdt. P. Souhuwat
Bend.       : Pdt. W.D. Dickkarhoff

1946–1947 
Ketua       : Pdt. P. Poot
Wakil Ketua : Pdt. ?
Sek.         : Pdt. P. Souhuwat
Bend.       : Pdt. W.D. Dickkarhoff

1947–1948 
Ketua      : Pdt. J.C.W. van Wyck Juranse
Wakil Ketua : Pdt. ?
Sek.         : Pdt. P. Souhuwat
Bend.       : Pdt. J.H. van Heerden

1948–1949 
Ketua       : Pdt. Dr. J.J. Geiser
Wakil Ketua  : Pdt. ?
Sek.          : Pdt. P. Souhuwat
Bend.        : Pdt. J.H. van Vesson

1949 
Ketua       : Pdt. C. Kainama
Wakil Ketua : Pdt. ?
Sek.         : Pdt. P. Souhuwat
Bend.       : Pdt. M.F. Syauta

1949–1950 (Persoalan RMS dan Sikap Sinode GPM) 
Ketua      : Pdt. S. Marantika
Wakil Ketua : Pdt. ?
Sek.         : Pdt. D. Louhenapessy
Bend.       : Pdt. M.F. Syauta

1953–1957 
Ketua      : Pdt. Chr. Mataheru
Wakil Ketua : Pdt. F.H. de Fretes
Sek.         : Pdt. D. Louhenapessy
Bend.      : Pdt. M.F. Syauta 
 
1957–1961 (dikeluarkan Pesan Tobat - 1960) 
Ketua      : Pdt. F.H. de Fretes
Wakil Ketua : Pdt. J.F.K. Wattimena - Pdt.W.D.F. Amanupunyo (Pengganti)
Sek.         : Pdt. D. Louhenapessy
Bend.       : Pdt. M.F. Syauta

1965–1970 (Reorganisasi Struktur dan Kepemimpinan GPM (I)) 
Ketua              : Pdt. Th. Pattiasina
Wakil Ketua        : Pnt. Chr. Soplanit, SH
Sekum              : Pdt. P. Tanamal
Wkl.Sekum          : Sdr. N.A. Likumahwa, BA
Sek.Dep. Koinonia : Pdt. D. Louhenapessy
Sek.Dep.Marturia : Pdt. F.C. Lewier, S.Th
Sek.Dep.Diakonia : Syms. Drs. H.J. Pooroe
Sek.Dep.Finek.     : Bpk. P.H. Pelamonia
Rektor Inst.Teol. : Pdt. A.N. Radjawane, S.Th (Ex Officio)

1970–1974 
Ketua                      : Pdt. Th. Pattiasina
Wakil Ketua                  : Syms. Drs. H.J. Pooroe  -  Pdt. A.N. Radjawane, M.Th (Pengganti)
Sekum                   : Pdt. P. Tanamal
Wkl.Sekum           : Drs.N.A. Likumahwa
Sek.Dep. Koinonia : Pdt. D. Louhenapessy
Sek.Dep.Marturia : Pdt. E.P. Kaihena, S.Th
Sek.Dep.Diakonia : Bpk. W. Louhenapessy
Sek.Dep.Finek.     : Bpk. P.H. Pelamonia  -  Drs. F.S. Pattinasarany (1972-1974)
Visitator                 : Pdt. M.J. Wattimena, S.Th

1974–1976 
Ketua                       : Pdt. Th. P. Pattiasina
Wakil Ketua                  : Pdt. M.J. Wattimena, S.Th
Sekum                   : Pdt. P. Tanamal, S.Th
Wkl.Sekum            : Drs.N.A. Likumahwa
Sek.Dep. Koinonia : Pdt. A. Pattianakotta, Sm.Th
Sek.Dep.Marturia : Pdt. E.P. Kaihena, S.Th
Sek.Dep.Diakonia  : Pdt. J. Ospara, S.Th
Sek.Dep.Finek      : Pdt. A.J. Soplantila, S.Th
Visitator                 : Pdt. F.C.Lewier, M.Th

1976–1978 
Ketua                       : Pdt. M.J. Wattimena, S.Th
Wakil Ketua                   : Pdt. F.C. Lewier, M.Th
Sekum                    : Pdt. A.J. Soplantila, S.Th
Sek.Dep. Koinonia  : Pdt. A. Pattianakotta, Sm.Th
Sek.Dep.Marturia  : Pdt. E.P. Kaihena, S.Th
Sek.Dep.Diakonia  : Pdt. J. Ospara, S.Th
Sek.Dep.Finek.      : Bpk. L. A. Tahalele
Visitator                 : Pdt. D. Louhenapessy

1978–1983 (Reorganisasi Struktur dan Kepemimpinan GPM (II)) 
Ketua             : Pdt. A.N. Radjawane, M.Th
Wakil Ketua        : Pdt. F.C. Lewier, M.Th
Sekum          : Pdt. A.J. Soplantila, S.Th
Wkl. Sekum  : Pdt. D. Louhenapessy
Visitator        : Pdt. E.P. Kaihena, S.Th
Pdt. M. Alfons
Drs. A. Rahalus 
Staff BPH Sinode GPM:
Sek. Dep.Kekes   : Pdt. E.P. Kaihena, S.Th (merangkap)
Sek.Dep.Pelpem : Pdt. J. Ospara, S.Th
Sek.Dep.Finek    : Bpk. L. A. Tahalele
Dir. LPJ GPM     : Pdt. F.C. Lewier, M.Th (merangkap) 
 
1983–1985 
Ketua             : Pdt. A.N. Radjawane, M.Th
Wakil Ketua        : Drs. A. Rahalus
Sekum          : Pdt. I.W.J. Hendriks, M.Th
Wkl. Sekum  : Pdt. J. Ospara, S.Th
Visitator        : Pdt. D. Lohenapessy
Pdt. W. Davidz, M.Th
Pdt. L. Lohy, S.Th 
Staff BPH Sinode GPM:
Sek.Dep.Kekes   : Pdt.E.P. Kaihena, S.Th
Pdt. W. Davidz, M.Th (Pjs)
Pdt. Ny. A. Maail (Pjs)
Sek.Dep.Pelpem  : Pdt. Drs. A. Rehawarin
Sek.Dep.Finek   : Pdt. D.E. Warella
Dir.LPJ-GPM     : Pdt. D.S. Izaak, S.Th

1986–1990 
Ketua            : Pdt. A.J. Soplantila, S.Th
Wakil Ketua         : Pdt. I.W.J. Hendriks, M.Th
Sekum      : Pdt. J. Ospara, S.Th
Wkl. Sekum       :  Pdt. J. Pattipawae, S.Th
 Pdt. L. Lohy, S.Th (Pjs)
Visitator        :  Pdt. M.J. Wattimena, S.Th
 Pdt. W. Davidz, M.Th
 Pdt. L. Lohy, S.Th
Staff BPH Sinode GPM:
Sek.Dep.Kekes    : Pdt. A.D. Maelissa, S.Th
Sek.Dep.Pelpem : Pdt. Ny.A. Maail
Sek.Dep.Finek    : Pdt. D.E. Warells
Dir.LPJ-GPM     : Pdt. D.S. Izaak, S.Th

1990–1995 (Reorganisasi Struktur dan Kepemimpinan GPM (III)) 
Ketua              : Pdt. A.J. Soplantila, S.Th
Wakil Ketua         : Pdt. Ny. A. Maail, S.Th
Sekum           : Pdt. S.P. Titaley, S.Th
Wkl. Sekum   : Pdt. S.J. Mailoa, S.Th
Anggota          : Pdt. M.J. Wattimena, M.Th
 Pdt. J. de Queljoe, S.Th
 Pnt. Drs. G. Sabono 
Staff BPH Sinode GPM:
Sek.Dep.Kekes     : Pdt. A.D. Maelissa, S.Th
Sek.Dep.Pelpem  : Pdt. Ny. A. Maail
Sek.Dep.Finek     : Pdt. D.E. Warella
Dir LPJ-GPM      : Pdt. S.J. Mailoa, S.Th

1995–2000 
Ketua           : Pdt. S.P. Titaley, S.Th
Wakil Ketua        : Pdt. L. Lohy, S.Th
Sekum          : Pdt. M.M. Siahaya, S.Th
Wkl. Sekum      : Pdt. J. de Queljoe, S.Th
Anggota         : Pdt. W. Davidz, M.Th
 Pdt. Ny.A. Maail
 Pnt. I.M. Pesireron 
Staff BPH Sinode GPM:
Sek.Dep.Kekes   : Pdt. Ny. J. Komul-Pattiasina, S.Th
Sek.PIKOM       : Pdt. A.D. Maelissa, S.Th
Sek.Dep.Pelpem  : Pdt. Chr. Sahetapy, S.Th
 Pdt. W. Homy, Sm.Th (pengganti)
Sek.Dep.Finek   : Pdt. D.E. Warella
 Pdt. J. Tuhumena, S.Th (pengganti)
Dir. LPJ-GPM    : Pdt. W. Davidz, M.Th

2000–2005 
Ketua              : Pdt. DR. I.W.J. Hendriks
Wkl. Ket. I     : Pdt. L. Lohy, S.Th
Wkl. Ket II    : Pdt. H.L. Leleury, Sm.Th
Sekum          : Pdt. S.J. Mailoa, M.Th
Wkl. Sekum  : Pdt. W. Davidz,M.Th
Anggota         : Pdt. M.M. Siahaya, S.Th
 Pdt. Ny. J. Komul-Pattiasina, S.Th
 Pnt. Drs. J. Labetubun 
Staff BPH Sinode GPM:
Sek.Dep. Kekes : Pdt. Ny. D.C. Manuputty, SIP
Sek. PIKOM     : Pdt. A.D. Maelissa, S.Th
Sek.Dep.Finek  : Pdt. J. Tuhumena, S.Th
Dir.LPJ-GPM    : Pdt. A. Rumthe, S.Th

2005–2010 (terjadi Sentralisasi Keuangan GPM 70:30%, Hasil Keputusan BPL ke-31 Tahun 2008 di Tual) 
Ketua         : Pdt. DR. John Ruhulessin, M.Si
Wakil Ketua I    : Pdt. Dr. M.M. Hendriks-Ririmasse
Wakil Ketua II    : Pdt. J. Manuhutu, S.Th
Sekum        : Pdt. V. Untailawan, M.Th
Wkl. Sekum    : Pdt. Drs. A.J.S. Werinussa, M.Si
Anggota       : Pdt. A. Orno, S.Si
 Pnt. J. de Queljoe, S.Th
 Pnt. Ir. Ny. M. Soukotta, M.Sc 
Staff BPH Sinode GPM:
Sek.Dep.Kekes    : Pdt. Ny. P. Ruhulessin, S.Th
 Pdt. N. Taberima, S.Th (penggantian)
Sek.Dep.Pelpem : Pdt. C. Leunufna, Sm.Th, SH
Sek.Dep.Finek  : Pdt. J. Teslatu, M.Si
Sek.Dep.PIKOM  : Pdt. Drs. H. Lekahena
Dir. LPJ-GPM   : Pdt. Ny. D.C. Manuputty, SIP

Annual Church meeting
Every year the church has an annual meeting (Sidang MPL) where plans are made for the next following year.   This meeting usually happens in November of each year.
Location of annual meeting:
2009: Larat, Tanimbar islands
2010: Latuhalat, Ambon
2011: Dobo, Aru islands
2012: Tepa, Babar island
2013: Taniwel, Seram island
2014: Lafa, Seram island
2015: Sidang MPL in Ambon at the Joseph Kam church building; Sidang Sinode in Ambon at the Maranatha church building
(both meetings ended up being held in January 2016)

Every five years at the big church meeting (Sidang Raya MPL) new board members are chosen.
Each board member can serve for a maximum of two consecutive terms. This meeting is always in Ambon.

The church currently has 575,000 members and 775 congregations, with over 750 pastors in 33 church districts throughout Maluku and part of North Maluku.

References

Calvinist denominations established in the 20th century
Maluku (province)
Members of the World Communion of Reformed Churches
Reformed denominations in Indonesia
Religious organizations based in Indonesia
Christian organizations established in 1935